Elhaida Dani (born 17 February 1993) is an Albanian singer, songwriter, composer and actress. Born and raised in Shkodër, Dani performed in diverse singing competitions and started to play piano as a child. In Italy, she is also prominent for being the winner of the first series of The Voice of Italy. She participated in Kënga Magjike for the first time in 2017 with the song "E Ngrirë" whereas she finished second.

Life and career

1993–2012: Early life and career beginnings 

Elhaida Dani was born on 17 February 1993 into an Albanian family of the Muslim faith in the city of Shkodër, Albania. She started singing at age four and subsequently took piano lesson. She later studied musicology at the University of Arts in Tirana. Dani started her initial forays into the music industry in 2009 as she won a multitude of music festivals, including Star Academy, Sunčane Skale, Festivalul George Grigoriu and Nova Musica. In December 2011, she attempted to represent Albania in the Eurovision Song Contest 2012, following her unsuccessful participation at the 50th edition of Festivali i Këngës with the song "Mijëra vjet". In June 2012, she was chosen as the winner of the ninth edition of Top Fest with the song "S'je më".

2013–2015: Voice of Italy and Eurovision 

In March 2013, Dani successfully auditioned for the first season of The Voice of Italy singing "Mamma Knows Best" for judges Piero Pelù, Raffaella Carrà, Riccardo Cocciante and Noemi and persuaded all four coaches to turn their chairs and chose to compete as one of the members of Team Cocciante. Dani received high scores in the time of her tenure on the show and ultimately won the competition in the final in May 2013 with over 70% of the votes. Later that year, she signed a record contract with the Italian subsidiary label of Universal Music.

In October 2014, the broadcaster, Radio Televizioni Shqiptar (RTSH), announced Dani as one of the contestants selected to compete in the 53rd edition of Festivali i Këngës with the song "Diell". She emerged as the winner of Festivali i Këngës and was thus confirmed as Albania's representative for the Eurovision Song Contest 2015. After being selected, Dani announced that she had changed her song to "I'm Alive", due to the composer's withdrawal of "Diell". In the contest, Albania qualified for the grand final during the first semi-final and ultimately finished in the 17th place with a total of 34 points.

2016–present: Notre-Dame de Paris and continued success 

In 2016, she has been called by Riccardo Cocciante and Luc Plamondon to play the role of Esmeralda in the world renown musical Notre Dame de Paris. And since 2016 she is touring worldwide. In December she competed in Kënga Magjike ending up in second place with 988 points. Returning after a three-year absence, Dani released her second extended play Zanin on 20 September 2021, which she created with Albanian songwriters and producers such as Alban Kondi, Elgit Doda, Endrit Mumajesi and Kledi Bahiti. Since October 2022, she has been competing on the 8th season of Dancing with the Stars Albania, getting the maximum jury points on several occasions during the live shows.

Discography

Extended plays

Singles

As lead artist

Other charted songs

References

External links 

1993 births
21st-century Albanian women singers
21st-century Italian women singers
Albanian emigrants to Italy
Albanian-language singers
Albanian Muslims
Albanian pianists
Albanian songwriters
Eurovision Song Contest entrants for Albania
Eurovision Song Contest entrants of 2015
Festivali i Këngës winners
Living people
Musicians from Shkodër
The Voice (franchise) winners
21st-century women pianists